Roderick Green (born April 26, 1982) is a former American football defensive end. He was drafted by the Baltimore Ravens in the fifth round of the 2004 NFL Draft. He played college football at Central Missouri.

Green also played for the San Francisco 49ers and California Redwoods.

College career
Green played college football at Central Missouri where he recorded 114 tackles, 13 sacks and four forced fumbles. He majored in physical education.

Professional career

Baltimore Ravens
Green was selected by the Baltimore Ravens in the fifth round (153rd overall) in the 2004 NFL Draft. In his rookie season, he played in nine games, recording six tackles. He made his NFL debut against the Kansas City Chiefs on October 4. In 2005, Green recorded 11 tackles and notched up his first two sacks of his NFL career.

In July 2006, he was involved in an altercation at a bowling alley in which he was stabbed.  Green was available to report for training camp with the Ravens, but was released in the final cut before the 2006 regular season.

San Francisco 49ers
Green was signed by the San Francisco 49ers off waivers on September 3, 2006. In his first season with the 49ers, he played nine times amassing 12 tackles and a career high 4.5 sacks. In 2007, he only posted four tackles and two sacks. On February 26, 2008 the 49ers re-signed Green preventing him from going to free agency.

California Redwoods
Green was signed by the California Redwoods of the United Football League on October 19, 2009.

References

External links
Just Sports Stats

1982 births
Living people
People from Brenham, Texas
American football defensive ends
American football linebackers
Blinn Buccaneers football players
Central Missouri Mules football players
Baltimore Ravens players
San Francisco 49ers players
Sacramento Mountain Lions players